The 2008 Guam Democratic presidential caucus took place on May 3, 2008. Senator Barack Obama won by 7 votes, a margin of less than 0.2%. This resulted in each candidate getting 2 pledged delegates to the 2008 Democratic National Convention. Guam Democrats also sent five unpledged superdelegates to the convention.

Results 

Primary date: May 3, 2008

National pledged delegate votes determined: 4

See also 
 2008 United States presidential straw poll in Guam
 2008 United States presidential election
 2008 Guam Republican presidential caucuses

References

Democratic territorial convention
Guam
2008